Alpine skiing at the 2006 Winter Olympics consisted of ten events, held at Sestriere and Cesana-San Sicario, Italy.  The races were held 12–25 February 2006.

Medal table

Men's events

Women's events

Participating NOCs
Fifty-eight nations contributed alpine skiers to the events at Torino.

Course information

Qualification
All entries had to be submitted to the organizing committee by 30 January 2006.

In general, athletes must be among the top 500 in the world in their event to compete.  They must also have no more than 120 FIS points.  Each National Olympic Committee may enter up to 22 athletes, but not more than 14 men or 14 women.  No more than 4 athletes from any NOC may compete in each event.

If an NOC has fewer than 2 athletes qualified under those rules, it may send one male and one female athlete with an FIS score of no more than 140 in the slalom or giant slalom event.

See also
Alpine skiing at the 2006 Winter Paralympics
List of Olympic medalists in alpine skiing

References

 TOROC Explanatory Book - Alpine Skiing
 FIS-SKI - FIS World Ski Championships medals, URL accessed 23 December 2005
 FIS-Ski - Olympic medals, URL accessed 21 December 2005
 Alpine Skiing Cup Standings, URL accessed 21 December 2005
 World Cup Calendar, from FIS-Ski, URL accessed 21 December 2005
  Sportsboken 2002 published by Sportsboken AS, edited by Tore Johansen

External links
FIS-Ski.com – alpine skiing – 2006 Winter Olympics – Sestriere and San Sicario, Italy

 
2006 Winter Olympics events
Alpine skiing at the Winter Olympics
Winter Olympics
Alpine skiing competitions in Italy